The Ukrainian green movement, founded in 1988 by Yuriy Shcherbak, was a name for loose group of various governmental and non-governmental organisations defending the environment in Ukraine.

Members
Members include:
Green party of Ukraine
Panukrainian Ecological League
National Ecological Center
Regional Ecological Center - Kiev
NGO "MAMA-86"

References

Politics of Ukraine